The 2015 Atlantic Coast Conference men's basketball tournament was the postseason men's basketball tournament for the Atlantic Coast Conference, held at the Greensboro Coliseum in Greensboro, North Carolina, from March 10–14, 2015. The tournament included fourteen of the fifteen ACC teams, as Syracuse did not compete due to a self-imposed postseason ban. Seeds 5 through 10 received a first-round bye, and the top four seeds received a "double bye" through the first round and second rounds. The 2015 tournament was the first to begin on a Tuesday and the first since 1981 to finish on a Saturday. The semifinals and championship game were played in the evening instead of their traditional afternoon timeslot. It was the fourth time a team has played 4 games (NC State in 1997 and 2007, Georgia Tech in 2010).  ESPN and the ACC Network televised all games, and the championship game was moved to Saturday to facilitate a prime-time broadcast on ESPN.

Seeds
Seeds for the tournament are determined by teams' conference records, with tiebreakers determined according to ACC tiebreaker rules.

Schedule

Bracket

Awards and honors
Tournament MVP: Jerian Grant, Notre Dame

All-Tournament Teams:

First Team
 Jerian Grant, Notre Dame
 Steve Vasturia, Notre Dame
 Pat Connaughton, Notre Dame
 Marcus Paige, North Carolina
 Brice Johnson, North Carolina
Second Team
 Demetrius Jackson, Notre Dame
 Justin Jackson, North Carolina
 Jahlil Okafor, Duke
 Anthony Barber, NC State
 Malcolm Brogdon, Virginia

See also
 2015 ACC women's basketball tournament

References

Tournament
ACC men's basketball tournament
College sports in North Carolina
Basketball competitions in Greensboro, North Carolina
ACC men's basketball tournament
ACC men's basketball tournament